Dale M. Volker (born August 2, 1940) is a former New York State Senator who represented the 59th district, which then covered Wyoming County, as well as portions of Erie, Livingston and Ontario counties. Volker is a Republican.

Biography
Dale Volker was born on August 2, 1940, the son of Assemblyman Julius Volker. He graduated from Canisius College and University at Buffalo Law School. Then he worked for the Depew Police Department.

Volker was a member of the New York State Assembly in 1973 and 1974. In November 1974, he ran for re-election, but was defeated by Democrat Vincent J. Graber, Sr.

On February 4, 1975, Volker was elected to the New York State Senate, to fill the vacancy caused by the resignation of Thomas F. McGowan. Volker was re-elected several times and remained in the State Senate until 2010, sitting in the 181st, 182nd, 183rd, 184th, 185th, 186th, 187th, 188th, 189th, 190th, 191st, 192nd, 193rd, 194th, 195th, 196th, 197th and 198th New York State Legislatures.

Volker served on the Codes Committee and was the "Chairman" of the Western New York Delegation,  a member of the Senate Subcommittee on Alcoholism, and a member of the Senate Public Protection Subcommittee. Prior to 1987 he was Chairman of the Senate Standing Committee on Energy. His other committee assignments included the Senate Standing Committees on Banks, Cities, Crime Victims, Crime and Corrections, Finance, Judiciary, Mental Health and Developmental Disabilities and Rules. Volker was also a member of the American Legislative Exchange Council (ALEC).

An April 26, 2007 article in the Times Union, noted that Volker was a vocal opponent of Rockefeller drug law reform in the state. Volker helped put the original Rockefeller laws in place as a way of combating the commutation of drug sentences by downstate, and particularly NYC circuit judges. Gabriel Sayegh, author of the piece and project director of New York City's Drug Policy Alliance office, explained that Volker's district benefited heavily from the state's prison industrial complex.

On April 30, 2010, Volker announced that he would not run for re-election.

References

1940 births
Living people
Republican Party New York (state) state senators
Canisius College alumni
University at Buffalo Law School alumni
Republican Party members of the New York State Assembly
21st-century American politicians